Deborah Coleman (October 3, 1956 – April 12, 2018) was an American blues musician. Coleman won the Orville Gibson Award for "Best Blues Guitarist, Female" in 2001, and was nominated for a W.C. Handy Blues Music Award nine times.

Biography
Coleman was born in Portsmouth, Virginia and raised in a music-loving military family that lived in San Diego, San Francisco, Bremerton, Washington, and the Chicago area. With her father playing piano, two brothers on guitar, and a sister who played guitar and keyboards, Deborah picked up guitar at age eight. She graduated in 1974 from Deep Creek High School in Chesapeake, Virginia. She worked in various professions, including as a master electrician, before pursuing a career in the music business.

She played at top music venues: North Atlantic Blues Festival (2007), Waterfront Blues Festival (2002), the Monterey Jazz Festival (2001), Ann Arbor Blues and Jazz Festival (2000), Sarasota Blues Festival (1999), the San Francisco Blues Festival (1999), and the Fountain Blues Festival (1998).

Coleman's Blind Pig debut, I Can't Lose (1997), was an album of ballads, blues stories, guitar playing and singing. Her version of Billie Holiday's "Fine and Mellow" was heard on college and public radio stations around the U.S. The album Soul Be It (2002) included the opener "Brick", "My Heart Bleeds Blue", "Don't Lie to Me," and a jump blues track, "I Believe". These was followed by What About Love? (2004) and Stop the Game (2007). Time Bomb (2007) featured three women blues musicians: Coleman, Sue Foley and Roxanne Potvin.

Coleman died unexpectedly on April 12, 2018 in a hospital in Norfolk, Virginia, from complications brought on by bronchitis and pneumonia.

Selective discography

Albums

Compilation albums

References

1956 births
2018 deaths
20th-century African-American musicians
21st-century African-American musicians
American blues guitarists
American blues singers
American blues singer-songwriters
Musicians from Portsmouth, Virginia
Singer-songwriters from Virginia
Contemporary blues musicians
Guitarists from Virginia
20th-century American guitarists
21st-century women guitarists
JSP Records artists
Telarc Records artists
Ruf Records artists
Blind Pig Records artists
20th-century American women guitarists
21st-century African-American women
American electricians